This table of types of hijab describes terminologically distinguished styles of clothing commonly associated with the word hijab.

The Arabic word hijāb can be translated as "cover, wrap, curtain, veil, screen, partition", among other meanings. In the Quran it refers to notions of separation, protection and covering in both literal and metaphorical senses. Subsequently, the word has evolved in meaning and now usually denotes a Muslim woman's veil. In English, the term refers predominantly to the  head covering for women and its underlying religious precepts. Not all Muslims believe the hijab is mandated in Islam.

See also
 Islam and clothing

References

External links
 BBC drawings depicting different forms of Islamic women's clothing
 Different Hijab and modest Islamic women's clothing

History of Asian clothing
Clothing-related lists
Veils
Hijab